Emil, also known as the Kranvagn, KRV or Emil Olsson was a heavy tank developed secretly in Sweden during the early 1950s; Kranvagn, meaning mobile crane, was a cover-name. The intention was to replace the Swedish Army's disparate tank fleet with a tank that could counter the Soviet IS series heavy tanks and be upgraded continuously. The initial design, in 1950, proposed mounting a 10.5 cm autoloader in an oscillating turret. Due to its size, weight and power to weight it was considered by many to be more of a medium tank than a heavy tank.

The project was discontinued during development and only two chassis were built. They were later rebuilt and served as testing platforms for the Artillerikanonvagn 151 and Stridsvagn 103 projects.

Project
At the end of World War II, it was clear that the mix of tanks in service in the Swedish Armed Forces was not just obsolete but also presented a large logistical problem. Kungliga Arméförvaltningens Tygavdelning (KAFT) conducted a study that concluded that the most cost-effective alternative would be to purchase the newly developed Centurion Mk 3, which while quite modern was judged to have upgrade potential for future requirements. A request of purchase was sent to the United Kingdom, but the reply was that no deliveries could be made before the needs of the British Army had been met first which was expected to take between five and 15 years.

In 1951, the vehicle bureau of KAFT set about to develop an indigenous manufactured alternative, which they did in great secrecy under the guise of constructing a mobile crane. Parallel with this, negotiations were entered with France about buying the AMX-13 light tank. All this came to an abrupt halt when the British in early December 1952 offered to sell the desired Centurions immediately in order to earn needed foreign currency. The Swedish Minister for Defence, Torsten Nilsson, ended the debate about the future tank purchase by (on his own initiative) signing a deal with the British at the beginning of 1953 with the first Centurion deliveries taking place in April 1953. The delegation in France was forced to depart under heavy apologies while the EMIL-project was terminated.

A consortium of Landsverk, Bofors and Volvo suggested to revive it for the Försvarsbeslut 1958 (white paper of Swedish defence policies 1958) where the replacement for the now ageing Centurions were to be decided upon. EMIL was however regarded as too costly and instead the S-tank proposal was put forward for the final draft which it won and it subsequently became the Stridsvagn 103.

Construction
Testing of the German Panther and the French AMX 13 tanks in Sweden heavily influenced the initial 1951 design for the Emil project. The known documented statistics for the initial 1951 "EMIL" were to be as follows:

Turret:
    Front – 180mm @ 45degs horizontal = 212mm eff
          Cheek, front on – 125mm @ 35 deg vertical = 218mm eff
          Cheek, side on – 125mm @ 80 deg horizontal = 127mm eff
    Side – 30mm
    Rear – 30mm
Hull:
    UFP – 100mm @ 22 deg horizontal = 187mm eff
    LFP – 125mm @ 38 deg horizontal = 203mm eff
    Side – 20mm
    Rear – 30mm
Engine: 550 hp
Weight: 25.6t
Power to weight: 20.19 hp/t
Gun Depression/Elevation: -14(15 on sides) / +15

In 1952, the Emil project then progressed to be a counter for the Soviet IS-3 tank which influenced the shape of the hull while the oscillating turret was redesigned. The schematics for the three designs were split into four parts; frontal armor, side/rear armor, engine and armament. For the first studies and trials a chassis which resembled a low IS-7 was built.

There were multiple armor thicknesses for both the front and the side which caused a variation in projected weight between the Emil 1, Emil 2 and Emil 3.

Turret Configurations:

Alt A
     Turret -
          - 140mm @ 44 - 40 deg = 201mm - 217mm eff
     Hull -
          UFP - 75mm @ 25 deg = 177mm eff
          LFP - 120mm @ 38 deg = 195mm eff
Alt B
     Turret
          - 170mm @ 44 - 40 deg = 244mm - 264mm eff
     Hull
          UFP - 95mm @ 25 deg = 224mm eff
          LFP - 145mm @ 38 deg = 235mm eff

Side turret/side hull/Rear Configuration
     1: 40/20/30
     2: 60/30/30
     3: 80/40/40

Two main options were considered for armament:
120 mm calibre rifled gun ~L/40
150 mm calibre smoothbore gun~L/40
The ammunition feed regardless of gun was planned to be a dual-drum autoloader allowing for quick selection of ordnance (armor-piercing or high explosive).
A new prototype ammunition was tested, which was to be a combination of HEAT and APDS. In case of failure, a back up armament was chosen: a 105 mm calibre rifled gun ~L/67

Each design was to have a different engine;
Emil 1: 6cyl AOS-895 (500 hp)
Emil 2: 8cyl AV-1195 (540 hp) or 8cyl AVS-1195 (665 hp)
Emil 3: 12cyl AV-1790 (810 hp)

During testing of the 12cyl AV-1790 engine on the built Kranvagn hull it was discovered that after sending power to the cooling and other equipment the engine was only sending 723 hp to the drive wheel.

There were a total of 6 variations per Emil plan for a total of 18 variations. Weight varied between 30.7t for the Emil I A1 to 41.8t for the Emil III B3. Ultimately the Emil III B3 was the preferred option. The turret side armor (80mm) and rear armor (40mm) was to be dropped to 70mm at the side and 30mm at the rear to improve gun stability as well as gun elevation.

References

Heavy tanks of the Cold War
Tanks of Sweden
Military history of Sweden
Experimental and prototype tanks